Montebello is an unincorporated community in Nelson County, Virginia, United States.  It was among the communities severely affected by flash flooding from Hurricane Camille in 1969.

Climate
Montebello weather is like most of the Blue Ridge region, mild, but occasionally hot summers, cool and pleasant in the spring and fall and usually cold, chilly and occasionally snowy weather during the winter.

References
GNIS reference

Unincorporated communities in Nelson County, Virginia
Unincorporated communities in Virginia